Matheus Soares Thuler (born 10 March 1999) is a Brazilian professional footballer who plays as a centre-back for J1 League club Vissel Kobe.

Career

Early career
Thuler started his youth career at Flamengo and was the team captain for the winning side in the Copa São Paulo de Futebol Júnior in 2018.

Flamengo
Despite still playing for the under-20 team, Thuler debuted for Flamengo in 30 August 2017 in a Primeira Liga match against Paraná in a match were Flamengo fielded reserves and youngsters.

In 2018, after a strong performance at Copa São Paulo de Futebol Júnior Thuler was promoted to the professional team. He played a total of five matches at Rio de Janeiro State League when Flamengo rotated the roster. On 26 May 2018, he debuted in a Brazilian Série A match against Atlético Mineiro at Estádio Independência, he played alongside his former under-20 partner Léo Duarte due to injuries of Juan, Réver and Rhodolfo, Flamengo won that match 1–0. Thuler kept his partnership with Duarte for another four matches until the league break for the 2018 FIFA World Cup, on the last of this five-match run he scored his first goal in a 1–1 draw against Palmeiras at Allianz Parque.

On 17 July 2018, Thuler extended his contract with Flamengo until July 2023. On 28 August 2020, Thuler extended his contract with Flamengo until December 2024.

Loan to Montpellier
On 25 June 2021, Thuler signed for Ligue 1 club Montpellier on loan until the end of the 2021–22 season.

Vissel Kobe
On 1 August 2022, Thuler signed for J1 League club Vissel Kobe on loan until the end of the 2022 season. On 4 January 2023, it was announced that he would be permanently transferred to Vissel Kobe.

International career
On 12 June 2018, Thuler was called up to the Brazil U20s for an early period of training ahead of the 2019 South American U-20 Championship.

Career statistics

Honours
Flamengo
Copa Libertadores: 2019
Recopa Sudamericana: 2020
Campeonato Brasileiro Série A: 2019, 2020
Supercopa do Brasil: 2020
Campeonato Carioca: 2019, 2020

References

External links
 

1999 births
Living people
Sportspeople from Rio de Janeiro (state)
Brazilian footballers
Association football defenders
Campeonato Brasileiro Série A players
Ligue 1 players
J1 League players
CR Flamengo footballers
Montpellier HSC players
Vissel Kobe players
Brazil under-20 international footballers
Brazil youth international footballers
Brazilian expatriate footballers
Expatriate footballers in France
Brazilian expatriate sportspeople in France
Expatriate footballers in Japan
Brazilian expatriate sportspeople in Japan